Philip J. Serjeant (born 6 October 1929) is a Swazi former sports shooter. He competed in the trap and skeet events at the 1972 Summer Olympics.

References

External links
 

1929 births
Possibly living people
Swazi male sport shooters
Olympic shooters of Eswatini
Shooters at the 1972 Summer Olympics